First Light is the fifteenth studio album by the British progressive rock group the Enid, released on 6 October 2014. The album is mostly made up of newly re-recorded arrangements by the current line-up, of songs from the band's back-catalogue, plus two brand new tracks, which will be featured on forthcoming Enid albums, and a live version of "Mayday Galliard".
Fans who pre-ordered the album from the band's website before 21 September each had their name printed on the sleeve notes of the CD.

Track listing

Personnel
The Enid
Robert John Godfrey - keyboards, vocals
Dave Storey - drums, percussion
Max Read - guitars, bass, vocoder
Jason Ducker - guitars
Dominic Tofield - bass, percussion, guitar
Joe Payne - vocals

Production
Max Read - engineering, production
Jason Ducker - engineering
Robert John Godfrey - production
Joe Payne - lyrics
Dominic Tofield - cover art

References

The Enid albums
2014 albums